Victoria Newton (born 9 March 1972 in Liverpool, England) is the editor of The Sun. She formerly ran its "Bizarre" showbiz column and then became deputy editor of the paper, before becoming senior editor in February 2020.

Early life
She attended Rushcliffe School, a comprehensive in West Bridgford, Nottinghamshire, where her father, Don, was deputy-headmaster. She went to Newnham College, Cambridge.

Career
Newton started in Fleet Street in 1993 at the Daily Express as a trainee after graduating from university, and then worked at The People. In 1998, she became an assistant to Dominic Mohan on The Suns "Bizarre" pages, before becoming the paper's Los Angeles correspondent in 1999. Newton returned to the UK in 2002 to become the Daily Mail's showbiz editor, but returned to The Sun in 2003 to become editor of "Bizarre" replacing the departing Dominic Mohan . She described it as her "dream job" in September 2005.

In November 2007, it was announced that Newton would be leaving Bizarre and had been promoted to Head of Features and Entertainment. She was replaced by her assistant, Gordon Smart. Newton remained in this job until her appointment as the deputy editor of the News of the World in October 2009, a position she retained until the paper's closure in 2011. In September 2013, she was appointed the editor of The Sun on Sunday after being deputy editor of The Suns whole 7 day operation. Her immediate superior remained David Dinsmore, The Suns editor.

Newton was appointed as editor of The Sun in February 2020 when her predecessor Tony Gallagher became deputy editor of The Times. The Sun on Sunday is still being presided over by Newton, along with Keith Poole, and it is unclear if a dedicated editor will be appointed.

Awards
 British Press Awards 2006 – Show Business Writer of the Year

See also
 News Corporation
 News Limited

References

1972 births
Living people
Alumni of Newnham College, Cambridge
English journalists
Journalists from Liverpool
People from West Bridgford
The Sun (United Kingdom) editors